Don Tum is a district (amphoe) in the northern part of Nakhon Pathom province, central Thailand.

Etymology
The words Don and Tum in Thai mean 'land at a slightly high elevation'. Due to this, the district has never had problems with flooding.

History
Mueang Tum was an ancient city of the Srivijaya kingdom. The first official district name of this area was Sam Kaeo. Later it was renamed Kamphaeng Saen District.

The minor district (king amphoe) Don Tum was created on 1 January 1966, when seven tambon were split from Kamphaeng Saen District. It was officially upgraded to be a full district on 12 March 1969.

Geography
Neighboring districts are (from the north clockwise) Bang Len, Nakhon Chai Si, Mueang Nakhon Pathom and Kamphaeng Saen.

Administration
The district is divided into eight subdistricts (tambons), which are further subdivided into 68 villages (mubans). The township (thesaban tambon) Sam Ngam covers tambon Sam Ngam. Each of the other seven tambon has a tambon administrative organization (TAO).

Population
As 2023, Don Tum has a population of about 50,000 people.

Economy
Most of Don Tum is an agricultural area, but some of the population is engaged in junk trade. Some parts of the profession produce cheap clothes to Pratunam Market, Bangkok.

References

External links
amphoe.com

Don Tum